Tardiff is a surname. Notable people with the name include:

 George Tardiff (1936–2012), American football coach
 Jil C. Tardiff, American cardiologist
 Larry Tardiff, Canadian politician

See also

Tardif, surname